Year 1158 (MCLVIII) was a common year starting on Wednesday (link will display the full calendar) of the Julian calendar.

Events 
 By place 

 Byzantine Empire 
 Autumn – Emperor Manuel I (Komnenos) sets out from Constantinople at the head of an expeditionary army. He marches to Cillicia; and while the main army follows the coast road eastwards – Manuel hurries ahead with a force of only 500 cavalry. He manages to surprise King Thoros II (the Great), who has participated in the attack on Cyprus (see 1156). Thoros flees into the mountains and Cilicia is occupied by the Byzantines.

 Europe 
 January 11 – Vladislav II becomes king of Bohemia. He is crowned by Emperor Frederick I (Barbarossa) with a diadem (called by the chroniclers a diadema or circulus). Vladislaus is also invested with Upper Lusatia, and accompanies Frederick to Milan to suppress the rebellion in Lombardy (Northern Italy).
 The Diet of Roncaglia is convoked by Frederick I. He mobilises an army of 100,000 men and leaves in June for a second Italian expedition – accompanied by Henry the Lion and his Saxon forces. He crosses the Alps and lays siege to Milan. German forces capture the city from the rebels after a short siege. However Milan soon rebels again, with Empress Beatrice taken captive and forced into parading on a donkey.
 Raymond of Fitero, Spanish monk and abbot, pledges to defend the fortress of Calatrava (guarding the roads to Córdoba and Toledo) from incoming Muslim raiders. It is the founding moment of the Order of Calatrava, the spearhead of the Iberian armies during the Reconquista.
 August 31 – King Sancho III (the Desired) dies after a 1-year reign. He is succeeded by his 2-year-old son Alfonso VIII (the Noble) as ruler of Castile. The noble houses of Lara and Castro claim the regency, as the boy's uncle, Ferdinand II (ruler of León and Galicia).
 Portuguese forces, led by King Afonso I (the Great), conquer Pamela, Alcácer do Sal and Sesimbra from the diminished Almoravids.

 England 
 Summer – King Henry II travels to France to meet King Louis VII and propose a marriage between his three-year-old son Henry and Louis' daughter Margaret (less than a year old). She is shipped to England, as the future wife and queen. The Vexin region is promised to Margaret as dowry and is put under the care of the Knights Templar, until her future husband is old enough to take control of it.
 The 12-year-old William Marshal is sent to the Château de Tancarville in Normandy to be brought up in the household of William the Tancarville, a cousin of William's mother. He begins his training as a knight, this also includes academic studies, practical lessons in chivalry and courtly life, and warfare and combat (using wooden swords and spears).
 Welsh forces under Ifor Bach (Ivor the Short) attack Cardiff Castle and kidnap William Fitz Robert, Norman lord of Glamorgan, along with his family.

 Asia 
 September 5 – Emperor Go-Shirakawa abdicates the throne after a 3-year reign. He is succeeded by his 15-year-old son Nijō as the 77th emperor of Japan. Go-Shirakawa retains power, and gives Kiyomori Taira a higher position to lead a samurai-dominated government. 

 By topic 

 Economy 
 The English Pound Sterling (currency) is introduced.

 Education 
 The University of Bologna is granted its first privileges by Frederick I.

 Religion 
 The Diocese of Derry is founded in Ireland.

Births 
 August 6 – Al-Nasir li-Din Allah, Abbasid caliph (d. 1225)
 September 23 – Geoffrey II, duke of Brittany (d. 1186)
 Albert I (the Proud), margrave of Meissen (d. 1195)
 Baldwin of Bethune, French nobleman (d. 1212)
 Ermengol VIII (or Armengol), count of Urgell (d. 1208)
 Fujiwara no Ietaka, Japanese (waka) poet (d. 1237)
 Giordano Forzatè, Italian religious leader (d. 1248)
 Henry I, French nobleman and knight (d. 1190)
 Henry I (the Elder), German nobleman (d. 1223)
 Jinul (or Chinul), Korean Zen Master (d. 1210)
 Margaret of France, daughter of Louis VII (d. 1197)
 Philip of Dreux, bishop of Beauvais (d. 1217)
 Satō Tsugunobu, Japanese warrior (d. 1185)
 Taira no Shigehira, Japanese general (d. 1185)
 Theobald I, French nobleman and knight (d. 1214)
 Valdemar Knudsen, Danish bishop (d. 1236)
 Yvette of Huy, Belgian anchoress (d. 1228)

Deaths 
 April 26 – Martirius, archbishop of Esztergom
 July 19 – Wibald, German monk and abbot (b. 1098) 
 July 27 – Geoffrey VI, count of Nantes (b. 1134)
 August 20 – Rögnvald Kali Kolsson, Earl of Orkney 
 August 31 – Sancho III, king of Castile (b. 1134)
 September 22 – Otto I, German bishop (b. 1114)
 December 15 – Frederick II, German archbishop
 Abu Jafar ibn Atiyya, Almohad vizier and writer
 Anselm of Havelberg, German bishop (b. 1100)
 Barthélemy de Jur, French bishop (b. 1080)
 Oda of Brabant, Belgian prioress and saint 
 Thorbjorn Thorsteinsson, Norwegian pirate

References